The 1970–71 Czechoslovak Extraliga season was the 28th season of the Czechoslovak Extraliga, the top level of ice hockey in Czechoslovakia. 10 teams participated in the league, and Dukla Jihlava won the championship.

Regular season

Playoffs

Semifinals
 SONP Kladno – ZKL Brno 4:1 (0:0,1:1,3:0)
 ZKL Brno – SONP Kladno 5:1 (2:0 2:1 1:0)
 SONP Kladno – ZKL Brno 5:3 (1:1 3:1 1:1)
 SONP Kladno – ZKL Brno 1:0 (0:0 0:0 1:0)
 ZKL Brno – SONP Kladno 4:0 (1:0 0:0 3:0)
 ZKL Brno – SONP Kladno 5:1 (3:0 1:0 1:1)
 ZKL Brno – SONP Kladno 2:1 (0:1 1:0 1:0)
 Slovan CHZJD Bratislava – Dukla Jihlava 4:5 (3:2 1:2 0:1)
 Dukla Jihlava – Slovan CHZJD Bratislava 5:4 (1:1 3:1 1:2)
 Slovan CHZJD Bratislava – Dukla Jihlava 3:2 (2:0 0:0 1:2)
 Slovan CHZJD Bratislava – Dukla Jihlava 0:1 OT (0:0 0:0 0:0 0:1)
 Dukla Jihlava – Slovan CHZJD Bratislava 5:1 (1:1 2:0 2:0)

3rd place 
 SONP Kladno – Slovan CHZJD Bratislava 2:6 (0:0 1:5 1:1)
 Slovan CHZJD Bratislava – SONP Kladno 4:3 (3:0 1:2 0:1)

Final 
 Dukla Jihlava – ZKL Brno 5:3 (2:1 1:0 2:2)
 Dukla Jihlava – ZKL Brno 6:5 OT (1:2 0:0 4:3 1:0)
 ZKL Brno – Dukla Jihlava 0:1 (0:0 0:0 0:1)

1. Liga-Qualification

External links
History of Czechoslovak ice hockey

Czechoslovak Extraliga seasons
Czechoslovak
1970–71 in Czechoslovak ice hockey